The 2021 season for  was the eleventh season in the team's existence and the fifth as a UCI ProTeam.

The team started the season under the name , with the title sponsors being Bingoal, a Belgian sports betting website, and the Wallonia-Brussels government. On 25 March, it was announced that Belgian condiment brand Pauwels Sauces would be promoted to co-title sponsor, having increased their investment into the team. The team made their debut under their new name, the following day at the E3 Saxo Bank Classic.

Team roster 

Riders who joined the team for the 2021 season

Riders who left the team during or after the 2020 season

Season victories

References

External links 
 

Bingoal Pauwels Sauces WB
Bingoal Pauwels Sauces WB